The Netherlands competed at the 1984 Summer Olympics in Los Angeles, United States. 136 competitors, 82 men and 54 women, took part in 74 events in 15 sports.

Medalists

Archery

Both of the Dutch archers from the 1980 competition returned in 1984. Both shot much higher scores than they had four years earlier, but the field was more competitive with the return of many nations that had boycotted, and both dropped out of the top eight.

Women's Individual Competition:
Catherina Floris – 2422 points (→ 23rd place)

Men's Individual Competition:
Martinus Reniers – 2486 points (→ 13th place)

Athletics

Men's 5,000 metres 
 Stijn Jaspers
 Heat — 13:58.51 (→ did not advance)

Men's 3,000m Steeplechase
Hans Koeleman

Men's Marathon
Cor Vriend
 Final — 2:21:08 (→ 39th place)

Gerard Nijboer
 Final — did not finish (→ no ranking)

Cor Lambregts
 Final — did not finish (→ no ranking)

Men's Shot Put
 Erik de Bruin
 Qualifying Round — 19.28 m
 Final — 19.65 m (→ 8th place)

Women's 100 metres
 Els Vader
 Heat 1 — 11.43s
 Heat 2 — 11.56s (→ did not advance)

Women's 1,500 metres 
 Elly van Hulst
 Heat — 4:10.69
 Final — 4:11.58 (→ 12th place)

Women's Marathon
Carla Beurskens
 Final — 2:37:51 (→ 22nd place)

Women's 400m Hurdles 
 Olga Commandeur
 Heat — 56.67
 Semifinal — 57.01 (→ did not advance)

Women's Discus Throw
 Ria Stalman
 Qualifying Heat — 58.28m
 Final — 65.36m (→  Gold Medal)

Women's Long Jump
Tineke Hidding
 Qualification — did not start (→ did not advance, no ranking)

Women's High Jump 
 Marjon Wijnsma
 Qualification — did not start (→ did not advance)

Women's Heptathlon
 Tineke Hidding
 Final Result — 6147 points (→ 7th place)

 Marjon Wijnsma
 Final Result — 6015 points (→ 11th place)

Boxing

Men's Middleweight (– 75 kg)
 Pedro van Raamsdonk
 First Round – Defeated Augustus Oga (Kenya), on points (4:1)
 Second Round – Defeated Noe Cruciani (Italy), on points (5:0)
 Quarterfinals – Lost to Arístides González (Puerto Rico), on points (1:4)

Men's Heavyweight (– 91 kg)
 Arnold Vanderlyde →  Bronze Medal
 First Round – Bye
 Second Round – Defeated Egerton Forster (SLE), on points (4:1)
 Quarterfinals – Defeated Georgios Stefanopoulos (GRE), on points (5:0)
 Semifinals – Lost to Willie DeWit (CAN), on points (3:2)

Canoeing

Men's K-2 (500 metres)
Gert Jan Lebbink
Ron Stevens

Men's K-2 (1,000 metres)
Gert Jan Lebbink
Ron Stevens

Women's K-1 (500 metres)
Annemiek Derckx

Cycling

Sixteen cyclists, thirteen men and three women, represented the Netherlands in 1984.

Men's individual road race
 Jean-Paul van Poppel — +22:20 (→ 44th place)
 Hans Daams — did not finish (→ no ranking)
 Twan Poels — did not finish (→ no ranking)
 Nico Verhoeven — did not finish (→ no ranking)

Team time trial
 Jos Alberts
 Erik Breukink
 Maarten Ducrot
 Gert Jakobs

Individual pursuit
 Jelle Nijdam

Team pursuit
 Ralf Elshof
 Rik Moorman
 Jelle Nijdam
 Marco van der Hulst

Points race
 Derk van Egmond

Women's individual road race
 Leontine van der Lienden — +10:49 (→ 28th place)
 Hennie Top — +18:12 (→ 37th place)
 Thea van Rijnsoever — +18:12 (→ 39th place)

Diving

Women's 3m Springboard
Daphne Jongejans — 437.40 points (→ 10th place)

Equestrianism

Mixed Dressage Individual
Annemarie Sanders
Tineke Bartels
Jo Rutten

Mixed Dressage Team
Annemarie Sanders
Tineke Bartels
Jo Rutten

Hockey

Men's team competition
Preliminary round (group B)
 Defeated Canada (4-1)
 Defeated New Zealand (3-1)
 Drew with Pakistan (3-3)
 Lost to Great Britain (3-4)
 Defeated Kenya (3-0)
Classification Matches
 5th/8th place: Defeated Spain (0-0) after penalty strokes (10-4)
 5th/6th place: Lost to India (2-5) → 6th place

Team roster
 Peter van Asbeck
 Ewout van Asbeck
 Lex Bos (gk)
 Roderik Bouwman
 Cees Jan Diepeveen
 Theo Doyer
 Maarten van Grimbergen
 Arno den Hartog
 Tom van 't Hek
 Pierre Hermans (gk)
 René Klaassen
 Hans Kruize
 Hidde Kruize
 Ties Kruize
 Eric Pierik
 Ron Steens
Head coach: Wim van Heumen

Women's Team Competition
Round robin
 Defeated New Zealand (2-1)
 Defeated United States (2-1)
 Defeated West Germany (6-2)
 Drew with Canada (2-2)
 Defeated Australia (2-0) →  Gold Medal

Team roster
 Carina Benninga
 Fieke Boekhorst
 Marjolein Eijsvogel
 Det de Beus (gk)
 Irene Hendriks
 Elsemiek Hillen
 Sandra Le Poole
 Anneloes Nieuwenhuizen
 Martine Ohr
 Alette Pos (gk)
 Lisette Sevens
 Marieke van Doorn
 Aletta van Manen
 Sophie von Weiler
 Laurien Willemse
 Margriet Zegers
Head coach: Gijs van Heumen

Judo 

Men's Half-Middleweight
Rob Henneveld

Men's Middleweight
Ben Spijkers

Men's Heavyweight
Willy Wilhelm

Rowing

Sailing

Shooting

Swimming

Men's 100m Freestyle 
Hans Kroes
 Heat — 51.19
 B-Final — 51.64 (→ 13th place)

Edsard Schlingemann
 Heat — 51.33
 B-Final — 51.74 (→ 15th place)

Men's 200m Freestyle
Frank Drost
 Heat — 1:51.32
 Final — 1:51.62 (→ 6th place)

Hans Kroes
 Heat — 1:52.37
 B-Final — 1:52.36 (→ 11th place)

Men's 100m Backstroke 
Hans Kroes
 Heat — 57.48
 Final — 58.07 (→ 8th place)

Men's 100m Butterfly
Cees Vervoorn
 Heat — 55.46
 B-Final — 55.75 (→ 14th place)

Gérard de Kort
 Heat — 56.55 (→ did not advance, 24th place)

Men's 200m Butterfly
Frank Drost
 Heat — 2:01.18
 B-Final — 2:01.23 (→ 10th place)

Gérard de Kort
 Heat — 2:00.83
 B-Final — 2:01.30 (→ 13th place)

Men's 200m Individual Medley
Edsard Schlingemann
 Heat — 2:08.27 (→ did not advance, 18th place)

Men's 4 × 100 m Freestyle Relay 
Edsard Schlingemann, Peter Drost, Frank Drost, and Hans Kroes
 Heat — 3:27.60 (→ did not advance, 11th place)

Men's 4 × 200 m Freestyle Relay 
Hans Kroes, Peter Drost, Edsard Schlingemann, and Frank Drost
 Heat — 7:29.14
 Final — 7:26.72 (→ 7th place)

Women's 100m Freestyle 
Annemarie Verstappen
 Heat — 56.11
 Final — 56.08 (→   Bronze Medal)

Conny van Bentum
 Heat — 56.94
 Final — 56.43 (→ 4th place)

Women's 200m Freestyle 
Annemarie Verstappen
 Heat — 2:01.61
 Final — 1:59.69 (→  Bronze Medal)

Conny van Bentum
 Heat — 2:01.52
 Final — 2:00.59 (→ 5th place)

Women's 400m Freestyle 
Jolande van der Meer
 Heat — 4:16.65
 Final — 4:16.05 (→ 6th place)

Women's 800m Freestyle 
Jolande van der Meer
 Heat — 8:46.58
 Final — 8:42.86 (→ 6th place)

Women's 100m Backstroke
Jolanda de Rover
 Heat — 1:02.94
 Final — 1:02.91 (→  Bronze Medal)

Brigitte van der Lans
 Heat — 1:04.57
 Swimm-Off — 1:04.82
 B-Final — 1:04.75 (→ 12th place)

Women's 200m Backstroke
Jolanda de Rover
 Heat — 2:13.50
 Final — 2:12.38 (→  Gold Medal)

Brigitte van der Lans
 Heat — 2:20.63 (→ did not advance, 17th place)

Women's 100m Breaststroke
Petra Hillenius
 Heat — 1:14.09 (→ did not advance, 19th place)

Petra van Staveren
 Heat — 1:11.18
 Final — 1:09.88 OR (→  Gold Medal)

Women's 200m Breaststroke
Petra Hillenius
 Heat — 2:41.57 (→ did not advance, 18th place)

Petra van Staveren
 Heat — 2:37.20
 Final — 2:36.32 in B final (→ 10th place)

Women's 100m Butterfly
Conny van Bentum
 Heat — 1:02.01
 Final — 1:01.94 (→ 7th place)

Annemarie Verstappen
 Heat — 1:01.50
 Final — 1:01.56 (→ 4th place)

Women's 200m Butterfly
Conny van Bentum
 Heat — 2:13.74
 Swim-Off — 2:13.60
 Final — 2:17.39 (→ 8th place)

Women's 4 × 100 m Freestyle Relay
Annemarie Verstappen, Elles Voskes, Desi Reijers, and Wilma van Velsen
 Heat — 3:47.65
Annemarie Verstappen, Elles Voskes, Desi Reijers, and Conny van Bentum
 Final — 3:44.40 (→  Silver Medal)

Women's 4x100 Medley Relay
Jolanda de Rover, Petra van Staveren, Annemarie Verstappen, and Desi Reijers
 Heat — DSQ (→ did not advance)

Synchronized swimming

Women's Solo
Marijke Engelen
Catrien Eijken
Marjolein Philipsen

Women's Duet
Marijke Engelen and Catrien Eijken

Water polo

Men's team competition
Preliminary round (group A)
 Defeated Canada (10-9)
 Lost to Yugoslavia (5-9)
 Defeated China (10-8)
Final Round (Group D)
 Lost to United States (7-8)
 Lost to Spain (4-8)
 Lost to Yugoslavia (5-9)
 Lost to Australia (7-8)
 Lost to West Germany (2-15) → 6th place

Team roster
 Johan Aantjes
 Stan van Belkum
 Wouly de Bie
 Ton Buunk
 Ed van Es
 Anton Heiden
 Nico Landeweerd
 Aad van Mil
 Ruud Misdorp
 Dick Nieuwenhuizen
 Eric Noordegraaf
 Roald van Noort
 Remco Pielstroom

References

Nations at the 1984 Summer Olympics
1984
Summer Olympics